Valenti is the second Japanese studio album (fourth overall) by South Korean singer BoA. It was released on January 29, 2003. Valenti debuted at number one on the weekly charts with over 615,000 copies in its first week.

Track listing

Charts and sales

Weekly charts

Monthly charts

Year-end charts

Sales and certifications

Singles

References

BoA albums
2003 albums
Avex Group albums